Konstanty Haliszka (30 January 1913 – 20 October 1964) was a Polish footballer. He played in three matches for the Poland national football team from 1934 to 1935.

References

External links
 

1913 births
1964 deaths
Polish footballers
Poland international footballers
Place of birth missing
Association footballers not categorized by position